Aurificaria is a genus of fungi in the family Hymenochaetaceae. The type species, Aurificaria indica, is currently the only species in this genus.

Hymenochaetaceae
Monotypic Basidiomycota genera